This is a list of 3D films released prior to 2005.

The tables can be sorted by clicking the arrow icons in the column headers. The abbreviations Po and Ps indicate single-strip over/under print and single-strip side-by-side print respectively.

1914-1952 films

Feature films 1952–2004

Short films 1952–2004

See also 
 List of 3D films
 List of 3D films (2005 onwards)
 3D film
 List of computer-animated films

External links 
 Stereoscopy.com 3D Movie Database
 The3DRevolution.com – A most complete, historically accurate and up-to-date 3-D Feature and Special Venue Film List
 Explore3DTV.com – Complete listing of 3D Movies in Theaters and Coming Soon
 1st 3D Portal/WebTV ONLINE 3D Vision
 List at IMDB

References 

3D films till 2004
Lists of films by technology

de:Liste von 3D-Filmen
it:Elenco di film in 3D
hu:Térhatású filmek listája
ms:Senarai filem 3-D
ru:Список фильмов в формате 3D